Franco Albanelli (25 August 1933 – 1 July 2007) was an Italian luthier, a pupil of Gaetano Pollastri.

Albanelli was born in Castel San Pietro Terme, Emilia-Romagna, Italy.

His workmanship has always shown a clear inspiration to his teacher Pollastri style and his musical instruments are now all around the world.  He made not more than 40 instruments, primarily violins, but included a few violas and violincellos.

He primarily produced instruments with a red and orange varnish.

He died in San Lazzaro di Savena, Emilia-Romagna, Italy, in 2007.

References
Il Suono di Bologna, Da Raffaele Fiorini ai grandi maestri del Novecento". Catalogo della Mostra nella chiesa di San Giorgio in Poggiale, Bologna 2002. 
Eric Blot, Un secolo di Liuteria Italiana 1860-1960 - A century of Italian Violin Making - Emilia e Romagna I, Cremona 1994. 
Dictionary of 20th Century Italian Violin Makers - Marlin Brinser 1978
The Strad January 1984 Bologna - A living tradition of Violin Making
 

1933 births
2007 deaths
People from Castel San Pietro Terme
Italian luthiers
20th-century Italian musicians